This is a list of developers of indie games, which includes video game developers who are not owned by nor do they receive significant financial backing from a video game publisher. Independent developers, which can be single individuals, small groups, or large organizations, retain operational control over their organizations and processes. Some self-publish their own games while others work with publishers.

List of notable developers

There are thousands of independent game development studios which either self-publish their titles, or enter into licensing or co-development agreements with publishers. This list is not intended to be exhaustive with respect to developers or their games, and includes only notable developers and their most notable game examples.

See also
 Casual game
 Dojin soft
 Fangame
 Indie game
 List of video game developers

References

External links
 Indie DB, a comprehensive database of indie developers and titles.

 
Indie
Indie